Munsey Park is a village in Nassau County, on the North Shore of Long Island, in New York, United States. It is considered part of the Greater Manhasset area, which is anchored by Manhasset. The population was 2,809 at the 2020 census.

The Incorporated Village of Munsey Park is located within the Town of North Hempstead and has been recognized as a Tree City USA since 1983.

History 

The village was first developed in the 1920s on North Shore land previously owned by wealthy publisher Frank Munsey as a commuter town and "model, restricted community" taking advantage of the Long Island Rail Road's Manhasset station. The land was bequeathed by Munsey to The Metropolitan Museum of Art in 1925, which developed the planned community under the leadership of museum president Robert W. DeForest. It was developed featuring Colonial-style houses and streets named for American artists. Much of the original landscaping was designed by the Olmsted Brothers.

In 1928, Munsey Park's first model home opened.

In 1930, residents voted 155-to-3 to incorporate their community as a village with its own municipal government and zoning ability. Residents incorporated after learning about the creation of a sewer district serving Greater Manhasset; the proposal led to a significant amount of concern amongst many of the locals, who were opposed to sewering the area. 

Since the Village of Munsey Park was located a considerable distance away from the former Plandome Road School, the Manhasset Union Free School District built the Munsey Park Elementary School within the village in the 1930s.

On December 8, 1974, Munsey Park Village Hall opened. It is located at 1777 Northern Boulevard and was built to conform to the style of residential homes in the village.

Munsey Park was first designated as a Tree City USA by the National Arbor Day Foundation in 1983, and has been recognized as such ever since.

In 2008, the Village of Munsey Park was ranked as the 13th (tied) Wealthiest Town in America by BusinessWeek.

The name of the community was originally to be Munsey Meadows – but this name was changed to Munsey Park; it is named in honor of Frank Munsey.

Geography

Munsey Park is split between two drainage areas: Leeds Pond and Whitney Pond. These two drainage areas are sub-watersheds of the larger Manhasset Bay Watershed, which in turn is part of the larger Long Island Sound/Atlantic Ocean Watershed, which covers all of Nassau and Suffolk Counties.

Munsey Park, in its entirety, uses the Manhasset 11030 postal code and is served by the Manhasset Post Office.

Economy 
Munsey Park is a bedroom community of the City of New York, which is how the community was originally envisioned as being by the Metropolitan Museum of Art. As such, a significant number of Munsey Park residents commute to/from New York for work.

The village itself is predominantly residential in character, with the heavy majority of lots within the village being zoned for single-family homes. The only businesses within Munsey Park are at three small shopping centers along the north side of Northern Boulevard; these are the only areas of the Village zoned for commercial use.

When originally planned, the intersection of Manhasset Woods Road and Park Avenue was to contain businesses, as well as near Locust Place (now Munsey Place); these plans were eventually amended in favor of single-family homes.

Demographics

2020 census 
As of the census of 2010, there were 2,809 people residing in the village.

2010 census 
As of the census of 2010, there were 2,693 people residing in the village. The racial makeup of the village was 91.20% White, 0.41% African American, 6.46% Asian, 0.37% from other races, and 1.56% from two or more races. Hispanic or Latino of any race were 3.23% of the population.

Census 2000 
As of the census of 2000, there were 2,632 people, 817 households, and 731 families residing in the village. The population density was 5,073.4 people per square mile (1,954.3/km2). There were 833 housing units at an average density of 1,605.7 per square mile (618.5/km2). The racial makeup of the village was 93.35% White, 0.34% African American, 5.66% Asian, 0.08% from other races, and 0.57% from two or more races. Hispanic or Latino of any race were 1.63% of the population.

There were 817 households, out of which 48.6% had children under the age of 18 living with them, 82.6% were married couples living together, 5.0% had a female householder with no husband present, and 10.5% were non-families. 9.3% of all households were made up of individuals, and 5.3% had someone living alone who was 65 years of age or older. The average household size was 3.22 and the average family size was 3.43.

In the village, the population was spread out, with 30.8% under the age of 18, 4.8% from 18 to 24, 23.6% from 25 to 44, 28.5% from 45 to 64, and 12.4% who were 65 years of age or older. The median age was 40 years. For every 100 females, there were 98.9 males. For every 100 females age 18 and over, there were 93.3 males.

The median income for a household in the village was $149,100, and the median income for a family was $159,147. Males had a median income of $100,000 versus $46,250 for females. The per capita income for the village was $66,772. About 1.6% of families and 2.3% of the population were below the poverty line, including 2.5% of those under age 18 and 1.2% of those age 65 or over.

Government

Village government 

As of January 2023, the Mayor of Munsey Park is Lawrence Ceriello, the Deputy Mayor is Anthony D'Angelo, and the Village Trustees are Antonio D'Angelo, Regina Im, Gregory Licalzi, Jr., and Joseph Williams.

Representation in higher government

Town representation 
Munsey Park is located in the Town of North Hempstead's 6th council district, which as of January 2023 is represented on the North Hempstead Town Council by Mariann Dalimonte (D – Port Washington).

Nassau County representation 
Munsey Park is located in Nassau County's 9th Legislative district, which as of January 2023 is represented in the Nassau County Legislature by Richard Nicoello (R – New Hyde Park).

New York State representation

New York State Assembly 
Munsey Park is located within the New York State Assembly's 16th State Assembly district, which as of January 2023 is represented by Gina L. Sillitti (D–Manorhaven).

New York State Senate 
Munsey Park is located in the New York State Senate's 7th State Senate district, which as of January 2023 is represented in the New York State Senate Jack M. Martins (R–Old Westbury).

Federal representation

United States Congress 
Munsey Park is located in New York's 3rd congressional district, which as of January 2023 is represented in the United States Congress by George A. Santos (R).

United States Senate 
Like the rest of New York, Munsey Park is represented in the United States Senate by Charles Schumer (D) and Kirsten Gillibrand (D).

Politics 
Munsey Park contains 2 election districts: AD 16 – ED 63 and AD 16 – ED 64. Both of these districts are located within New York's 16th assembly district (AD16) and are located entirely within the village.

In the 2016 U.S. presidential election, the majority of Munsey Park voters voted for Donald Trump (R).

Education

School district 
The Village of Munsey Park is located entirely within the boundaries of (and is thus served by) the Manhasset Union Free School District. As such, all children who reside within Munsey Park and attend public schools go to Manhasset's schools.

As aforementioned, the Munsey Park Elementary School is located within the village.

Library district 
Munsey Park is located within the boundaries of the Manhasset Library District.

Media

Newspapers 
The Manhasset Press is the newspaper of record for the Village of Munsey Park. It is owned by Anton Media Group.

Other major newspapers serving Munsey Park include Newsday, New York Post, The New York Times, and The Wall Street Journal.

Television 
Munsey Park is one of North Shore TV's fourteen member villages. North Shore TV provides Munsey Park and the other member villages with public-access television programming, through Altice USA and Verizon Fios – the main cable television providers in the area.

Parks and recreation

Munsey Park owns and operates two municipal parks:

 Copley Pond Park
 Waldmann Memorial Park

Additionally, the short-lived, unsuccessful 18-hole Munsey Park Golf Club was formerly located at the eastern end of the village between 1932 and 1937, and the Munsey Park Elementary School also features a playground and recreational fields.

Park district 
Munsey Park is wholly located within the boundaries of (and is thus served by) the Manhasset Park District. This special park district owns and operates numerous parks and parking facilities throughout the Greater Manhasset area.

Infrastructure

Transportation

Roads 
Munsey Park is served by two state roads, which also form portions of the village's boundaries. Northern Boulevard (New York State Route 25A) forms the southern border of the village, while Port Washington Boulevard (New York State Route 101) forms its eastern border.

Other major streets within the village include Park Avenue, Park Avenue North, and Manhasset Woods Road.

Many streets, such as Sargent Place and Eakins Road, use a street naming convention based on famous artists.

Rail 
No rail service passes through Munsey Park. The nearest Long Island Rail Road station to the village is Manhasset on the Port Washington Branch.

Bus 
Munsey Park is served by the n20H, n21, and n23 bus routes, which are operated by Nassau Inter-County Express (NICE). These three bus routes travel through the area via Northern Boulevard and Port Washington Boulevard.

Utilities

Natural gas 
National Grid USA provides natural gas to homes and businesses that are hooked up to natural gas lines in Munsey Park.

Power 
PSEG Long Island provides power to all homes and businesses within Munsey Park.

Sewage 
Munsey Park is unsewered. As such, the entirety of the village relies on cesspools and septic systems, as opposed to being connected to sanitary sewers.

Water 

Munsey Park is located within the boundaries of the Manhasset–Lakeville Water District, which provides the entirety of Munsey Park with water.

The Manhasset–Lakeville Water District also owns and operates a water tower within the village, known as the Munsey Park Water Tower.

Healthcare & emergency services

Healthcare 
There are no hospitals located within Munsey Park. The nearest hospital to the village is St. Francis Hospital in Flower Hill.

Law Enforcement 
The Village of Munsey Park is served by the 6th Precinct of the Nassau County Police Department, with RMP 609 assigned as the Munsey Park car. 

Policing is funded through village and county taxes.

Fire district 
Munsey Park is located entirely within the boundaries of (and is thus served by) the Manhasset–Lakeville Fire Department.

Notable people 

 William E. Haugaard – Architect. Haugaard served as the State Architect for the State of New York between 1928 and 1944.
 Elaine R. Phillips – Financial adviser and politician. Phillips had served as a Village Trustee before moving to adjacent Flower Hill, where she would serve as Mayor before being elected to the New York State Senate in 2016 and then as Nassau County Comptroller in 2021.
Jeanne Singer – Pianist and composer.

In popular culture
Over the years, scenes for shows and movies have been filmed within the village. These include scenes for the film The Good Shepherd, which were shot within Munsey Park in 2005, and scenes for the television series The Good Wife, which were shot within the village in 2009.

See also 

 List of Tree Cities USA
List of villages in New York

References

External links

 Official website

Manhasset, New York
Villages in New York (state)
Villages in Nassau County, New York